Landsford Canal State Park is a South Carolina state park in Chester County,  from US 21. The  park contains the ruins of the Landsford Canal built  using slave labor to bypass rapids on the Catawba River between 1820 and 1825. The coming of the railroad caused the canal to be abandoned. The former lock keeper's house contains an interpretive museum. In addition to the canal, visitors also can see one of the largest remaining stands of Hymenocallis coronaria, the Shoals spider-lily, that grows in the shoals of the river and blooms from mid-May to mid-June. The park offers hiking, picnicking, boating, and fishing, as well as a playground.

Trails

There are three trails, all of which originate at the picnic area.

The Canal Trail is the most popular trail and follows the Landsford Canal. Some original stonework and locks remain, and there are markers along the trail with illustrations of the original bridges and canals with information on the construction of the canal and its impact on the region.

The Nature Trail follow a stretch of the Catawba River, ending at a viewing area to see the Rocky Shoals Spider Lilies.

The Eagle Point Trail is the shortest of the trails and ends at a bluff overlooking the Catawba River.

Each of the trails has unique attributes, and hikers can expect to see frogs, turtles, snakes, and a variety of birds including a pair of resident bald eagles.

References

External links
Landsford Canal information on South Carolina State Parks website
South Carolina State Parks website

Protected areas of Chester County, South Carolina
State parks of South Carolina
Museums in Chester County, South Carolina
Canal museums in the United States
Transportation museums in South Carolina